Gliese 693 is a red dwarf star and a flare star of spectral type M2 located in the constellation Pavo, 18.95 light-years from Earth.

References

Pavo (constellation)
M-type main-sequence stars
0693
086990